The Maraş Triple Junction is a geologic triple junction of three tectonic plates: the Anatolian Plate, the African Plate and the Arabian Plate.

The Maraş Triple Junction is found where the side-by-side African and Arabian plates, both drifting north and demarcated by the north-south trending Dead Sea Transform (itself an extension of the African Rift Valleys), come up against the Anatolian Plate lying across their path at the East Anatolian Fault. The junction site is near the Gulf of Alexandretta. After a long quiescence, this junction was ruptured by the violent 2023 Turkey-Syria earthquake.

References

Triple junctions
Plate tectonics
Geology of Turkey